The Government of the Federation of Rhodesia and Nyasaland was established in 1953 and ran the Federation until its dissolution at the end of 1963. The members of the government were accountable to, and drawn from, the unicameral Federal Parliament.

Initial Government 1953

Huggins Government

Welensky government

Parliamentary Secretaries

Federation of Rhodesia and Nyasaland
.Federation of Rhodesia and Nyasaland
Federation of Rhodesia and Nyasaland people
Lists of government ministers of Rhodesia
1953 establishments in the Federation of Rhodesia and Nyasaland
1963 disestablishments in the Federation of Rhodesia and Nyasaland